The alpha-1D adrenergic receptor (α1D adrenoreceptor), also known as ADRA1D, is an alpha-1 adrenergic receptor, and also denotes the human gene encoding it.

Receptor
There are 3 alpha-1 adrenergic receptor subtypes: alpha-1A, -1B and -1D, all of which signal through the Gq/11 family of G-proteins and different subtypes show different patterns of activation. They activate mitogenic responses and regulate growth and proliferation of many cells.

Gene
This gene encodes alpha-1D-adrenergic receptor. Similar to alpha-1B-adrenergic receptor gene, this gene comprises 2 exons and a single intron that interrupts the coding region.

Ligands
 Antagonists
 A-315456
 BMY 7378 (also α2C antagonist)

See also
Adrenergic receptor

References

External links

Further reading

Adrenergic receptors